Villamaría is a town and municipality in the Colombian Department of Caldas. Located in the Colombian coffee growing axis, it was made part of the "Coffee Cultural Landscape" UNESCO World Heritage Site in 2011.

Climate 
The city of Villamaría and the lower parts of the municipality have a subtropical highland climate (Köppen Cfb).

While the higher parts of the municipality have an alpine tundra climate (ETH) and the highest part has an ice cap climate (EFH).

References

Municipalities of Caldas Department